The Californian may refer to:

Periodicals
The Californian (1840s newspaper), Monterey newspaper moved to San Francisco
The Californian (1860s newspaper), San Francisco literary newspaper
The Californian (1880s magazine), San Francisco literary magazine
 The Californian (Temecula), Temecula, California, now defunct
 The Bakersfield Californian, Bakersfield, California
 The Daily Californian, the student newspaper at the University of California at Berkeley
 The Salinas Californian, Salinas, California

Other uses
The Californian (Sunday's Best album)
The Californian (Bob Schneider album)
The Californian (film), 1937 western

See also
 Californian (disambiguation)
 The Californians (disambiguation)